Kindermann is a German surname. Notable people with the surname include:

August Kindermann (1817–1891), German bass-baritone
Balthasar Kindermann (1636–1706), German poet
Franz Kindermann, German merchant
Heinz Kindermann (born 1942), German politician
Johann Erasmus Kindermann (1616–1655), German composer

Sport
Sociedade Esportiva Kindermann, women's football club in Brazil

See also
Kinderman

German-language surnames